The 1979 PBA season was the fifth season of the Philippine Basketball Association (PBA).

Season highlights
After a two-year absence of playing against each other in the championship between the league's most noted rivalry, Crispa and Toyota played once again in the finals during the All-Filipino Conference. Crispa prevailed in five games, winning the deciding game, 118–111 on July 7. 
On September 4, the visiting Washington Bullets, which lost to Seattle SuperSonics in the 1979 NBA Finals, played against a PBA All-Star Selection at the Araneta Coliseum in an exhibition game attended by Philippines First Lady Imelda Marcos, the Bullets with the line-up of hall of famers Elvin Hayes, Wes Unseld and among others, Greg Ballard, Dave Corzine and coach by Dick Motta, won the match, 133–123. The PBA selection were coach by Baby Dalupan and played with five imports and one locals from each of the nine ballclubs.   
Royal Tru-Orange won their first PBA title in the Open Conference by defeating Toyota Tamaraws, 102–101 in Game 4 for a 3–1 series win. The Orangemen were led by imports Otto Moore and Larry Pounds and they became the fourth team to win a championship in the 1970s.
Three different teams emerge champions in the league's fifth season as the Toyota Tamaraws avoided a third runner-up finish by winning the Invitational championship against rival Crispa Walk Tall Jeans.

Opening ceremonies
The muses for the participating teams are as follows:

Champions
 All Filipino Conference: Crispa Redmanizers
 Open Conference: Royal Tru-Orange
 Invitational Championship: Toyota Tamaraws
 Team with best win–loss percentage: Toyota Tamaraws (44–18, .710)
 Best Team of the Year: Toyota Tamaraws (3rd)

Individual awards
 Most Valuable Player: Atoy Co (Crispa)
 Rookie of the Year: Arnie Tuadles (Toyota)
 Mythical Five:
Robert Jaworski (Toyota)
Atoy Co (Crispa)
Ramon Fernandez (Toyota)
Arnie Tuadles (Toyota)
Philip Cezar (Crispa)

Board of governors
 Leopoldo Prieto (Commissioner) 
 Domingo Itchon (President, Elizalde and Co., Inc.)
 Dante Silverio (Vice-President, Delta Motor Corporation)
 Walter Euyang (Treasurer, Universal Textile Mills)
 Jose Castro, Jr. (Executive Secretary)
 Pablo Carlos (Delta Motor Corporation)
 Valeriano "Danny" Floro (P. Floro and Sons)
 Emerson Coseteng (Mariwasa Group)
 Leonardo "Skip" Guinto (San Miguel Corporation)
 Porfirio Zablan (CFC Corporation)
 Carlos Palanca III (La Tondeña, Inc.)

Cumulative standings

References

 
PBA